Tamaizumi-ike Dam is an earthfill dam located in Yamaguchi prefecture in Japan. The dam is used for irrigation. The catchment area of the dam is 2 km2. The dam impounds about 2  ha of land when full and can store 124 thousand cubic meters of water. The construction of the dam was completed in 1941.

References

Dams in Yamaguchi Prefecture
1941 establishments in Japan